Admiral Sir Arthur Mostyn Field,  (27 June 1855 – 3 July 1950) was a senior officer in the Royal Navy who served as Hydrographer of the Navy from 1904 to 1909.

Biography
Field was born in Braybrooke, Northamptonshire, the youngest son of Captain John Bousquet Field of the Royal Navy and his wife Cecilia Mostyn. He was educated at Lymington and enlisted in 1868 as a cadet in the Royal Navy, where he joined the training ship .

After two years basic training Field was appointed in succession to HMS Trafalgar and HMS Narcissus as a midshipman. After further courses of instruction. he was promoted lieutenant in 1875. The following year he was posted to the newly converted survey ship, spending the next four years in the Red Sea, the Mediterranean and the east coast of Africa, followed by a survey mission to the Oil Rivers of West Africa. In 1882 he went in HMS Sylvia to survey the Straits of Magellan.

Field was promoted commander in 1889, and served from 1890 to 1894 on  around Borneo. For the next few years, he worked taking depth soundings in home waters, based on the survey vessel . He was appointed Hydrographer of the Navy in August 1904.

Field was elected a Fellow of the Royal Society in 1905 as a "distinguished hydrographic surveyor". His application citation referred to "Marine Surveys in command of HM Ships from 1886 to 1904 in Australia, Pacific Islands, China Seas, and British Islands", and said he had done much for the scientific explorations of the deep oceans.

Field was promoted to the rank of rear admiral in 1906, vice admiral in 1910, and placed on the retired list later that year. He was made Knight Commander of the Order of the Bath in the 1911 Coronation Honours, and advanced to the rank of admiral on the Retired List on 4 June 1913.

Field wrote on surveying, expanding the textbook "Hydrographical Surveying" written by Admiral Sir William Wharton.

Field had a daughter, Cecilia, who went on to study at Somerville College, Oxford. He died in Christchurch, Hampshire in 1950. His son, Midshipman T. M. Field, was killed in the battlecruiser  at the Battle of Jutland in 1916.

References

1855 births
1950 deaths
British hydrographers
Fellows of the Royal Astronomical Society
Fellows of the Royal Geographical Society
Fellows of the Royal Society
Hydrographers of the Royal Navy
Knights Commander of the Order of the Bath
People from North Northamptonshire
Royal Navy admirals
English hydrographers